Christopher Bwalya Yaluma is the minister of commerce, trade and industry in Zambia. He has held that position since February 2018. He was formerly the minister of mines and minerals. Yaluma is a member of the  Patrotic Front, the ruling political party in Zambia.

He has a Bachelor of Science and diploma in electrical engineering.

References

External links
"Christopher Bwalya Yaluma". The Report Company.

Patriotic Front (Zambia) politicians
Commerce, Trade and Industry ministers of Zambia
Mines ministers of Zambia
Living people
Year of birth missing (living people)
Place of birth missing (living people)
Date of birth missing (living people)